Martin Heavey (born 1943 in Rhode, County Offaly) is an Irish retired sportsperson.  He played Gaelic football with his local club Rhode and was a member of the Offaly senior inter-county team from 1971 until 1973.

References

1943 births
Living people
Rhode Gaelic footballers
Offaly inter-county Gaelic footballers